David Anderson (born August 16, 1996) is an American professional ice hockey goaltender who is currently playing with KHL Sisak in the Croatian Ice Hockey League and International Hockey League.

Awards and honors

References

https://www.eliteprospects.com/player/317359/david-anderson

External links

 https://www.eliteprospects.com/player/317359/david-anderson

1996 births
Living people
KHL Sisak players
Ice hockey players from California